Ofer Feldman (Japanese: オフェル・フェルドマン; Hebrew: עפר פלדמן; born 1954) is an Israeli-Japanese Professor of Political Psychology and Political Behavior at Doshisha University, Kyoto, Japan.

Ofer Feldman was born in Israel in 1954 and moved to Japan in 1982. In 1994 he became a Japanese citizen. He received his Ph.D. degree from the University of Tokyo (major: Social Psychology) in 1987. Since then he has published numerous academic papers in various international journals. In addition, he has published, edited and co-edited 12 books and monographs on Japanese political behavior and communication, political psychology, political discourse and political leadership and personality. He is the 1993 Recipient of the Erik H. Erikson Award for Distinguished Early Career Contribution to Political Psychology, from the International Society of Political Psychology. Other honors and awards include fellowships from Japan Foundation (1989, 1993), Japanese Ministry of Education (1990–2003, 2008–2011), Matsushita International Foundation (1993–94), Nomura Foundation (1994), Kikkoman Foundation (1996), Japan Society for the Promotion of Science (1999–2001), Daiwa Anglo-Japanese Foundation (1999), Fulbright (2001–2002), Mershon Center, Ohio State University (2001–2002), Polish Academy of Science, Institute of Psychology & the Warsaw School of Social Psychology (2006), El Colegio de Veracruz, Mexico, (2007) and Lady Davis Fellowship, The Hebrew University of Jerusalem (2009–2010). He also served as the Chair [President] of the Psycho-Politics Research Committee within the International Political Science Association (tenure 2000–2006; 2012–2015). He currently lives in Kyoto.

Publications
 Feldman, O. (1989) Ningen shinri to seiji [Human Psyche and Politics.] Tokyo: Waseda Daigaku Shuppanbu, 218p. (in Japanese).
 Feldman, O. (1992) Imeji de yomu nagatacho: Seijiteki imeji no yakuwari to kozo ni kansuru jisshoteki kenkyu [Perceiving Japanese Politics Through Images: An Empirical Study on the Role and Structure of Political Image]. Tokyo: Miraisha, 270p.(in Japanese).
 Feldman, O. (1993) Politics and the News Media in Japan. Ann Arbor: The University of Michigan Press, 221p. (2nd and 3rd printings 1995).
 Feldman, O. (1999) The Japanese Political Personality: Analyzing the Motivations and Culture of Freshmen Diet Members. London: Macmillan & New York: St. Martin's Press, 182p. (in association with International Political Science Association's Advances in Political Science: An International Series)
 Feldman, O. (2004) Talking Politics in Japan Today. Brighton; UK, & Portland, Or; US: Sussex Academic Press, 214p. (paperback ed., May 2005).
 Feldman, O. (2006) Seiji Shinrigaku [Political Psychology]. Kyoto: Mineruba Shobo, 340p. (in Japanese).
 Zmerli, S. & Feldman, O. (Eds.) (2015) Politische Psychologie: Handbuch für Studium und Wissenschaft [Political Psychology: Handbook for Study and Science], Nomos Verlagsgesellschaft, Germany: Baden-Baden, (in German).
 Kinoshita, K. & Feldman, O. (2018) Seijika wa naze shitsumon ni kotaenai ka [Why Politicians Don't Answer Questions?], Kyoto: Mineruba Shobo, 293p. (in Japanese).
 Feldman, O. & Zmerli, S. (Eds.) (2019) The Psychology of Political Communicators: How Politicians, Culture, and the Media Construct and Shape Public Discourse. NY & London: Routledge (Routledge Studies in Political Psychology), 240p.
 Feldman, O. (Ed.) (2020) The Rhetoric of Political Leadership: Logic and Emotion in Public Discourse. Cheltenham, UK & Northampton, US: Edward Elgar, 250p.
 Feldman, O. (Ed.) (2021) When Politicians Talk: The Cultural Dynamics of Public Speaking. Singapore, Springer, 300p.

References

External links 
 Homepage at Doshisha University

Israeli Jews
Israeli scientists
Japanese Jews
Japanese scientists
Naturalized citizens of Japan
1954 births
Living people
University of Tokyo alumni
Israeli emigrants to Japan
Political psychologists